Ángelo José Rodríguez Henry (born 4 April 1989) is a Colombian professional footballer who plays as forward for Categoría Primera A club Deportivo Pereira.

Career 
On July 10, 2018, Rodríguez signed with Minnesota United, becoming the club's second ever designated-player signing. On January 24, 2020, Rodríguez and Minnesota mutually parted ways.

References

External links 
 

1989 births
Living people
Colombian footballers
Colombian expatriate footballers
Colombian expatriate sportspeople in the United States
Categoría Primera A players
Categoría Primera B players
Atlético Nacional footballers
Real Cartagena footballers
Alianza Petrolera players
Uniautónoma F.C. footballers
Envigado F.C. players
Independiente Medellín footballers
Deportes Tolima footballers
Minnesota United FC players
Deportivo Cali footballers
Designated Players (MLS)
People from Archipelago of San Andrés, Providencia and Santa Catalina
Association football forwards
Major League Soccer players